The Battle of Richmond, Kentucky, fought August 29–30, 1862, was one of the most complete Confederate victories in the war by Major General Edmund Kirby Smith against Union major general William "Bull" Nelson's forces, which were defending the town. It was the first major battle in the Kentucky Campaign. The battle took place on and around what is now the grounds of the Blue Grass Army Depot, outside Richmond, Kentucky.

Background
In the fall of 1862, two Confederate armies moved on separate paths into Kentucky, hoping to put the shadow Confederate government of Kentucky into power, threaten Union cities along the Ohio River, and recruit men to join the Confederate Army. First to move was Smith, leading the Confederate Army of Kentucky, whose ideas provided the initiative for the offensive. General Braxton Bragg, commanding the Army of Mississippi, moved on a roughly parallel track to the west. Smith departed Knoxville on August 13, and Bragg left Chattanooga on August 27.

Opposing forces

Union

Confederate

Battle
Brigadier General Patrick Cleburne led Smith's advance, with Colonel John S. Scott's cavalry out in front. The Confederate cavalry, while moving north from Big Hill on the road to Richmond, Kentucky on August 29, encountered Union troopers and began skirmishing. After noon, Union artillery and infantry joined the fray, forcing the Confederate cavalry to retreat to Big Hill.

At that time, Brigadier General Mahlon D. Manson, who commanded Union forces in the area, commanded a brigade to march to Rogersville, Kentucky towards the rebels. Fighting for the day stopped after pursuing Union forces briefly skirmished with Cleburne's men in the late afternoon. That night, Manson informed his superior, Bull Nelson, of his situation, and he ordered another brigade to be ready to march in support when required. Manson arrayed his four regiments to the south of Mt Zion church and had them prepare for an attack. 

Smith ordered Cleburne to attack in the morning and promised to hurry reinforcements (Brigadier General Thomas J. Churchill's division). Cleburne started early, marching north, passed through Kingston, dispersed Union skirmishers, and approached Manson's battle line near Zion Church. As the day progressed, additional troops joined both sides. Following an artillery duel, the battle began, and Mason reinforced the Union left flank which he thought was weakening. But Churchill's troops used a hidden ravine to come up on his right, and after a concerted Confederate attack on the Union right, the Union troops gave way. Retreating into Rogersville, they made another futile stand at their old bivouac.

By now, Smith and Nelson had arrived and taken command of their respective armies. Nelson rallied some troops in the cemetery outside Richmond, but they were routed.

Aftermath
Nelson and some of his men escaped, but the Confederates captured over 4,300 Union troops. Total casualties were 5,353 (206 killed, 844 wounded, and 4,303 captured or missing) on the Union side, and 451 (78 killed, 372 wounded, and one missing) for the Confederates. The way north towards Lexington and Frankfort was open.

Civil War historian Shelby Foote remarked that Smith "accomplished in Kentucky the nearest thing to a Cannae ever scored by any general, North or South, in the course of the whole war."

Battlefield preservation

The Civil War Trust (a division of the American Battlefield Trust) and its partners have acquired and preserved 365 acres of the Richmond Battlefield.

The Mt. Zion Christian Church, which served as a hospital during the battle and has cannonballs embedded in its brick walls, is listed on the National Register of Historic Places.

Two discontinuous areas totalling  were listed on the National Register of Historic Places as Battle of Richmond Historic Areas in 1996.  These included four contributing buildings.

See also

List of battles fought in Kentucky

Notes

References
National Park Service battle description
CWSAC Report update – Kentucky

Eicher, David J., The Longest Night: A Military History of the Civil War, Simon & Schuster, 2001, .
Foote, Shelby, The Civil War: A Narrative, Vol. 1: Fort Sumter to Perryville, Random House, 1958, .

Further reading

External links
Battle of Richmond Association website
The Battle of Richmond: Battle maps, History articles, and preservation news (CWPT)
Battle of Richmond Civil War Heritage Byway at American Byways

Richmond
Richmond
Richmond
National Register of Historic Places in Madison County, Kentucky
Richmond
1862 in Kentucky
1862 in the American Civil War
August 1862 events
Conflict sites on the National Register of Historic Places in Kentucky
American Civil War on the National Register of Historic Places
Richmond, Kentucky